The Politics of Veneto, a Region of Italy takes place in a framework of a semi-presidential representative democracy, whereby the President is the head of government, and of a pluriform multi-party system. Executive power is exercised by the Regional Government. Legislative power is vested in both the government and the Regional Council.

The Statute of Veneto was promulgated in 1971 and largely rewritten in 2011. Article 1 defines Veneto as an "autonomous Region", "constituted by the Venetian people and the lands of the provinces of Belluno, Padua, Rovigo, Treviso, Venice, Verona and Vicenza", while maintaining "bonds with Venetians in the world". Article 2 sets forth the principle of the "self-government of the Venetian people" and mandates the Region to "promote the historical identity of the Venetian people and civilisation".

On 22 October 2017 an autonomy referendum took place in Veneto: 57.2% of Venetians participated and 98.1% voted "yes".

The current president of Veneto is Luca Zaia of Liga Veneta–Lega, by far the largest party in the Regional Council.

Political history
Prior to the rise of Fascism, most of the deputies elected in Veneto were part of the liberal establishment (see Historical Right, Historical Left and Liberals), which governed Italy for decades, but also the main opposition parties, namely the Radical Party and the Italian Socialist Party, had a good sway among Venetian voters. In the 1919 general election, the first held with proportional representation, the Catholic-inspired Italian People's Party came first with 42.6% (gaining at least 10% more than in any other region) and the Socialists were in second place with 36.2%. In the 1924 general election, which led Italy to dictatorship, Veneto was one of the few regions, along with Lombardy and Piedmont, which did not return an absolute majority to the National Fascist Party.

From World War II to 1994 Veneto was the heartland of Christian Democracy, which polled 60.5% in the 1953 general election and steadily above 50% until the late 1970s, and led the Regional Government from its establishment in 1970 to 1993. In the 1990s Veneto became a stronghold of the centre-right Pole/House of Freedoms coalition, which governed the region from 1995 to 2010 under Giancarlo Galan of Forza Italia. In 2010 Galan was replaced by Luca Zaia of Liga Veneta–Lega Nord, who obtained a hefty and record-breaking 60.2% of the vote and whose coalition government included The People of Freedom/Forza Italia and, since 2013, the New Centre-Right; Liga Veneta was the largest party with 35.2% of the vote. Zaia and Liga Veneta were confirmed in 2015, with a reduced but more cohesive majority, due to the split of Tosi List for Veneto and the diminishment of Forza Italia: Zaia won 50.1% of the vote, while Liga Veneta a thumping 40.9%, largely ahead of the opposition Democratic Party's 20.5%.

Veneto is home to Venetian nationalism (or Venetism), a political movement that appeared in the 1970s, demanding political and fiscal autonomy for the region (which is felt by Venetists to be a nation in its own right) and promoting Venetian culture, language and history. This was the background from which Liga Veneta emerged in 1980. In the 1990s and 2000s other Venetist parties (the Union of the Venetian People, the Veneto Autonomous Region Movement, Lega Autonomia Veneta, Liga Veneta Repubblica, North-East Project, etc.) emerged, but they never touched the popularity of Liga Veneta, which was a founding member of Lega Nord in 1991. Some Venetists have campaigned for federal reform and/or autonomy, others (notably including the Venetian National Party, the Party of the Venetians, Veneto State, Venetian Independence, Veneto First, Plebiscito.eu, Venetian Left, Independence We Veneto and We Are Veneto) for outright independence.

Executive branch

The Regional Government is led by the President of Veneto and composed of the President and ten Ministers (Assessori), including a Vice President.

Current composition

The current regional government has been in office 16 October 2020, under the leadership of President Luca Zaia of Liga Veneta–Lega Nord.

List of previous Governments

Legislative branch

The Regional Council of Veneto (Consiglio Regionale del Veneto) is composed of 51 members. 49 councillors are elected in provincial constituencies by proportional representation using the largest remainder method with a Droop quota and open lists, while the remaining two are the elected President and the candidate for President who comes second. The winning coalition wins a bonus of seats in order to make sure the elected President has a majority in the Council.

The Council is elected for a five-year term, but, if the President suffers a vote of no confidence, resigns or dies, under the simul stabunt, simul cadent (literally: "they will stand together or they will fall together") clause introduced in 1999, also the Council is dissolved and a snap election is called.

Current composition

Local government

Provinces
Veneto is subdivided into seven provinces, including Venice which has functioned as a metropolitan city since 2015.

All the seven provinces, but especially Vicenza, Verona and Padua, were long Christian Democratic heartlands. In the early 1990s, when the Venetian and Italian party systems experienced huge realignments, Treviso, Vicenza and Verona became strongholds of Liga Veneta–Lega Nord, while in Padua, the region's most populated, Forza Italia/The People of Freedom/Forza Italia was the dominant political force; only two provinces, Venice and Rovigo, have traditionally been the powerbases of the centre-left and, more recently, the Democratic Party, while Belluno is a swing province. In the 2015 regional election Liga Veneta came largely first in each and every province.

Since 2014 provinces have lost many powers to the region and the municipalities, and, contextually, provincial presidents have been elected by mayors and municipal councillors, whose votes are weighted according to the population of their municipalities. In some cases, elected Presidents represent bipartisan or trans-party coalitions. For instance, Enoch Soranzo was elected in Padua thanks to the decisive support of the Democratic Party, while the majority of his party, Liga Veneta, had endorsed another candidate, and Achille Variati was endorsed both by the Democrats and Forza Italia in Vicenza. In 2015 the Province of Venice was replaced by the Metropolitan City of Venice and the mayor of Venice, Luigi Brugnaro, was sworn in as metropolitan mayor too.

Municipalities
Twenty-six comuni of Veneto have more than 25,000 inhabitants.

Eleven are controlled by Liga Veneta, five by the Democratic Party, three by Forza Italia and one by the Brothers of Italy. Five mayors are non-party independents: two of these are supported by Liga Veneta, Forza Italia and the Brothers of Italy, two by the Democratic Party and the remaining one by a local nonpartisan coalition.

Political parties and elections

Latest regional election

The latest regional election took place on 20–21 September 2020.

Luca Zaia of Liga Veneta–Lega was re-elected President by a landslide 76.8% of the vote, while his main rival Arturo Lorenzoni stopped at 15.7%. Liga Veneta, which ran an official party list and a list named after Zaia, was confirmed the largest in the region with a combined 61.5% of the vote. The Democratic Party came second with 11.9% and the Brothers of Italy third with 9.6%. The total score of Venetist parties was 65.6%, the highest ever.

Latest general election in Veneto

The centre-right coalition (56.3%), this time dominated by the Brothers of Italy, obtained a far larger victory than four years before over the centre-left coalition (23.0%), Action – Italia Viva (8.4%) and the Five Star Movement (5.8%). One third of deputies and senators were elected in single-seat constituencies and, as in 2018, the centre-right won all such constituencies. Among parties, the Brothers of Italy came largely first with 32.7% of the vote, followed by the Democratic Party (16.3%) and Lega (14.5%). The biggest turnaround happened within the centre-right, as Lega lost more than half of the votes obtained in 2018 (–17.7pp) and the Brothers of Italy jumped from 4.2% to virtually eight times that share (+28.5pp).

References

Sources
 Veneto Region – Legislatures
 Regional Council of Veneto – Elections
 Cattaneo Institute – Archive of Election Data
 Ministry of the Interior – Historical Archive of Elections

External links
 Veneto Region
 Regional Council of Veneto
 Constitution of Veneto

 
Veneto